A Maccaferri gabion is a name given to a type of gabion produced by the Maccaferri family.

In 1893, in Casalecchio di Reno near Bologna, Italy, for the first time large amounts of wire mesh Maccaferri sack gabions were used to repair dams destroyed by a flood of the river Reno. At the beginning of the 20th century, the Maccaferri family purchased a patent for a new type of box gabion, so called Palvis (Gabbioni a scatola Palvis) and started the industrial production and introduction on a vast scale of gabions and mattresses for civil engineering use.

In 1911, Gaetano Maccaferri established business relationships in Spain, Greece and Austria. Before World War II, a process of diversification started with acquisitions in various industrial fields, but the erosion control sector remain the core business. This process has brought the Maccaferri technology and technical expertise to all countries of the world, with a direct presence in more than forty countries on all continents.

References

Gabions
Warfare of the Middle Ages